Kazi Township is a township of Lhünzhub County, in east-central Tibet Autonomous Region, People's Republic of China, located  west of the county seat, and about  north of the main urban area of Lhasa , it has 6 villages under its administration.

References

External links

Populated places in Lhasa (prefecture-level city)
Township-level divisions of Tibet
Lhünzhub County